Jukka Kalevi Jylli is a Finnish bass-player who played in the psychedelic/progressive rock group Kingston Wall.

Career 
After Kingston Wall was disbanded, he played in a group called Saunabadh. At the same time as his rock career flourished Jylli was also active in the Helsinki pub music scene, playing with the pioneering multinational local punk-folk band Boolabus, fronted by the late Mark Flynn. Nowadays his most active band is Zook. Jukka Jylli plays in the Marenne Band's debut album to be released in 2009.

References

Finnish bass guitarists
Year of birth missing (living people)
Living people